Gimik is a Philippine youth-oriented television series produced and broadcast by ABS-CBN. The show ran from June 15, 1996, to February 6, 1999, replacing Game Na Game Na! and was replaced by G-mik every Saturday for 90 minutes and was shown internationally through TFC.

The series was streaming on Jeepney TV YouTube channel.

Premise
Gimik circles throughout the lives of 12 juveniles. It tackles the fun, experiences and the problems that the youth encounter. Pre-marital sex, unwanted pregnancy, insecurities of a middle child, sibling rivalry, broken families, parent-child conflict, jealousy, animosity, sexual preference, aids awareness, love relationships and student life.

Plot
Dianne (Judy Ann Santos), is an only child of a very modern couple, a young socialite. Ricky (Rico Yan), a son of rich doctors, the boy-next-door and is the object of Dianne's fancy. He was a medical student but changed his course to Business Administration afterwards. Gina (G. Toengi), is the older sister of Carlo (Patrick Garcia) the best friend of Toffee (Kristopher Peralta). Gina is a Textiling Major. Their parents are in the States and they live with their grandmother. Joey (Marvin Agustin), tactless and as such is suffering from the Middle Child Syndrome. He is a Computer Science Major. Jigs (Diego Castro), an asthmatic teenager with an over-protective mother. Gary (Diether Ocampo), dropped out from school because he enjoys working, he is a product of a broken family. Melanie (Mylene Dizon), a working student in a video shop. She moved from the province to study Nursing through a scholarship. She is a boarder in Kakai's (Kaye Abad) house. She and Andi (Andrea Blaesi) are inseparable and are in the age of experimenting. Ese (Jolina Magdangal), a fine arts student, bubbly and the colorful one and Brian (Bojo Molina), a medical student whose mother has animosity to Melanie as his girlfriend. Dianne and Gina are best friends as well as Ricky and Gary whose love stories are intertwined. Ese and Joey's love hate relationship, Melanie and Brian's thorny relationship add spices in the entire series.

Development
The teen-oriented show consisted mostly Talent Center artists (now ABS-CBN's Star Magic). It became the launching pad for the careers of the most successful young stars of their generation in the mid-1990s including Judy Ann Santos, Rico Yan, Jolina Magdangal, Diether Ocampo, Marvin Agustin, Patrick Garcia, Mylene Dizon, Kaye Abad and G Toengi. The series was originally created as part of ABS-CBN Corporation's 50th anniversary.

Additional cast
Several Talent Center artists joined the show when the original cast members (Judy Ann Santos, Rico Yan, Diether Ocampo, Jolina Magdangal, Patrick Garcia and Marvin Agustin) became successful in their separate careers, making it hard for them to appear regularly, nevertheless LJ Moreno, Kristine Hermosa and Dominic Ochoa were added. In 1997, Judy Ann Santos left the show to focus on Esperanza, Andrea Blaesi's character vanished in 1996 and Diego Castro later left the show and moved to rival show Growing Up, nonetheless Cheska Garcia, Carlos Agassi, Laura James, Rica Peralejo (from rival show T.G.I.S.), Baron Geisler, Paula Peralejo, John Lloyd Cruz and Desiree del Valle joined the show.

Cast and characters

Main cast
Judy Ann Santos as Dianne Villaruel (1996-1997)
Rico Yan as Ricardo "Ricky" Salveron (1996-1999)
Patrick Garcia as Carlo de Leon (1996-1998)
G. Toengi as Angelina "Gina" de Leon (1996-1999)
Diether Ocampo as Gary Leo "Gary" Ballesteros (1996-1999)
Jolina Magdangal as Socorro Corazon "Ese" Aragon (1996-1999)
Marvin Agustin as Joseph "Joey" Fajardo (1996-1999)
Mylene Dizon as Melanie Suntay (1996-1999)
Bojo Molina as Brian Lorenzo (1996-1999)

Supporting cast
Diego Castro III as Jigs Mercado (1996-1997)
Kaye Abad as Cassandra "Kakai" Marquez (1996-1999)
Kristopher Peralta as Teofilo "Toffee" Sanchez (1996-1999)
Andrea Blaesi as Andi Cuyugan (1996)
LJ Moreno as Cathy Dominguez (1996-1998)
Dominic Ochoa as Eric Abesamis (1997-1999)
Kristine Hermosa as Tintin Fernandez (1997-1998)
Rica Peralejo as Jersey Salveron (1997-1998)
Paula Peralejo as Pauline Salveron (1997-1999)
John Lloyd Cruz as Junie de Dios (1997-1999)
Cheska Garcia as Corrine Apostol (1997-1998)
Baron Geisler as Choy Ledesma (1997-1998)
Carlos Agassi as Marco Trinidad (1997-1998)
Laura James as Cindy Trinidad  (1997-1998)

Desiree del Valle as Dette Zubiri (1998-1999)

Extended and guest cast
Trisha Salvador as Kara
Claudine Barretto as Danielle
Wowie de Guzman as Warren
Mark Vernal as Banjo Mejia
Jodi Santamaria as Gretchen
Vanessa del Bianco as Daphne Ortiz 
Katrina De Leon as Matet
John Arcilla as Cesar Rivera 
Patrick Fiori as Miguel Montejo
William Thio as Dave Apostol
Donnie Fernandez as Chad Fernando
Anna Larrucea as Yanna Cortez
Tanya Garcia as Angela
Bernard Palanca as Skud Torres
Miguel dela Rosa as Migs
Don Laurel as Dondi Aranas
Nikki Valdez as Jek-Jek
Monica Verallo as Caroline
Miggy Tanchanco as Mikoy
Andrea del Rosario as Samantha Banzon
Kathleen Hermosa as Melanie's younger sister
Yayo Aguila as Dette's mother
Boboy Garovillo as Ese's father
Jim Paredes as Kakai's father
Julia Clarete as Jules
Gerard Pizzaras as Jerry
Diana Enriquez/Jhezarie Javier as Denise Salvador
Vivian Foz as Ese's mother
Patricia Ann Roque as Ese's sister
Hajji Alejandro as Dianne's father
Beverly Vergel as Dianne's mother
Orestes Ojeda as Ricky's father
Amado Cortez as Tanya's grandfather
Roy Alvarez as Joey's father
Mia Gutierrez as Joey's mother
Ray Ventura as Melanie's father
Raquel Villavicencio as Gary's mother
Jon Achaval as Marco and Cindy's father
Lorli Villanueva as Gina and Carlo's grandmother
Anna Marin as Brian's mother
Alwyn Uytingco as Joey's younger brother
Malou de Guzman as Melanie's mother
Ricky Belmonte as Brian's father
Subas Herrero as Corrine's father
Dick Israel
Justin Cuyugan
Lui Villaruz
Eula Valdez as Brenda
Amy Perez as Guy

GIMIK: The Reunion

Motion picture release Gimik: The Reunion was later made and was released on April 28, 1999, after the series ended in February 2 months later retaining all the main characters. Ricky, Ese, Joey, Gina, Gary, Melanie and Bryan look forward to love, marriage and career. Judy Ann Santos made a special appearance as her character Dianne in the latter part of the film. Kristine Hermosa and Dominic Ochoa, a regular cast since 1997, made cameo appearances in the movie with different roles.

Cast

Main cast
 G. Toengi as Gina de Leon
 Rico Yan as Ricky Salveron
 Diether Ocampo as Gary Ballesteros
 Jolina Magdangal as Ese Aragon
 Marvin Agustin as Joey Fajardo
 Mylene Dizon as Melanie Suntay
 Bojo Molina as Brian Lorenzo

Special participation
 Judy Ann Santos as Diane Villaruel

Supporting
 Eula Valdez as Brenda
 Kristine Hermosa as Suzette Pia
 Michael Verano as Andy
 Susan Africa as Mrs. Lorenzo
 Bodjie Pascua as Mr. Lorenzo
 Gigette Reyes as Mrs. de Leon
 Patricia Ann Roque as Emi
 Dominic Ochoa as the taxi driver
 Rica Peralejo as the little girl patient

Soundtrack
The Original Motion Picture Soundtrack to the film was released on March 30, 1999, two months before the release of the film. With its carrier single "Mahal Mo Ba Ako" by Jolina Magdangal, the soundtrack earned a Gold Record Certification from the Philippine Association of the Record Industry on May 7, 1999.

Adapted from the GIMIK: The Reunion Original Motion Picture Soundtrack liner notes.

Gimik 2010
In the same network's 2010 Trade Launch, the station announced that the show will return on television as part of Your Song with the title of Gimik 2010.

See also
 List of programs broadcast by ABS-CBN

References

External links

Telebisyon

ABS-CBN drama series
ABS-CBN original programming
Philippine teen drama television series
1996 Philippine television series debuts
1999 Philippine television series endings
1999 films
Star Cinema films
1990s Philippine television series
English-language television shows
Filipino-language television shows
Films set in the Philippines
Television series about teenagers
Television shows set in the Philippines